A displacement receiver is a device that responds to or is sensitive to directed distance (displacement).

Examples of displacement receivers include carbon microphones, strain gauges, and pressure sensors or force sensors, which, to within an appropriate scale factor, respond to distance.

In music, certain music keyboards can be considered displacement receivers in the sense that they respond to displacement, rather than velocity (as is more commonly the case).

Examples of displacement-responding sensors include the mechanical action of tracker organs, as well as the force-sensing resistors found in music keyboards that had polyphonic aftertouch capability.  Polyphonic aftertouch is no longer a feature of presently manufactured keyboards, but certain older models such as the Roland A50 featured a pressure sensing resistor, similar in principle-of-operation to a carbon microphone, in each key.

Transducers